Baikuntha Temple, also called Vaikunthanathar Kovil, is a South Indian Hindu temple situated in Jorasanko, Central Kolkata, India. It is situated on the bank of river hoogly which is a tributary of ganges.

Baikuntha It is known for its distinct South Indian architecture. It was completed in 1960. The temple sanctum sanctorum has a stone image of Lord Baikuntha with two consorts, Sridevi and Budevi, on either side.  The inside of the temple is constructed with white marble and has several pillars.it was said that this temple was constructed by Maharaj Prayag Narayan tiwari son of Maharaj revti narayan tiwari, the same temple is situated in shiwala kanpur also governed by Vijay narayan tiwari "mukul" and abhinav narayan tiwari(7th generation of Maharaj Prayag Narayan tiwari)

References 

Hindu temples in Kolkata